Poptel was initially an email and bulletin board service, and later a British internet and on-line services provider that was run by an employee cooperative (worker cooperative) from 1986 to 2002.

In the 1980s Poptel offered on-line communications and information services to international NGOs, working in particular with the Interdoc group. Poptel was a partner in the Manchester Host and the Kirklees Host and became known as a provider of Internet services to the Labour Party. Working with the National Cooperative Business Association of the US, it launched the successful bid to create a top level Internet domain for use exclusively by cooperatives - ".coop".

Poptel was "demutualised" and broken up into smaller businesses in September 2002. Staff from the web development department formed a new co-operative, Poptech (later Fused Technologies). OSG Co-op (now Midcounties Co-operative) took over the .coop registry operation. The retail Internet Services business was merged with The Phone Co-op in 2003. In 2012 the .coop registry was transferred to the International Co-operative Alliance.

History
Poptel was a trading name for Soft Solution Ltd, a worker co-operative founded in 1983. Poptel's first on-line service, based on the GeoNet platform, was launched in March 1986. The Manchester Host was launched in 1991.

References

External links
Interdoc the first international NGO computer network
.coop top level domain website
Case study: Poptel by journalist Andrew Bibby, c.2001
Poptel: how one workers' co-op was taken over by its investors by Andrew Bibby, first published in the Financial Times, 2003
Where are they Now List Of Ex Poptel Members
RIPA debate parliament 13 July 2000

Former worker cooperatives
Former internet service providers of the United Kingdom
Defunct companies based in Manchester
Former co-operatives of the United Kingdom